Martin Phiri (born 2 May 1991) is a Zambian footballer who plays as a forward for Green Buffaloes and the Zambia national football team.

References

External links

1991 births
Living people
Zambian footballers
Zambia international footballers
Green Eagles F.C. players
Power Dynamos F.C. players
NAPSA Stars F.C. players
Zanaco F.C. players
Green Buffaloes F.C. players
Association football forwards
Zambia A' international footballers
2018 African Nations Championship players